Byteflight is an automotive databus created by BMW and partners Motorola, Elmos Semiconductor and Infineon to address the need for a modernized safety-critical, fault tolerant means of electronic communication between automotive components.  It is a message-oriented protocol.  As a predecessor to FlexRay, byteflight uses a hybrid synchronous/asynchronous TDMA based means of data transfer to circumvent deficiencies associated with pure event-triggered databuses. 

It was first introduced in 2001 on the BMW 7 Series (E65).

Eclipse 500 jet aeroplanes use Byteflight to connect the avionics displays.

Data frame
In Byteflight terminology, a data frame is called a telegraph.

A telegraph starts with a start sequence containing six dominant bits.  This start sequence
is followed by a one byte message identifier. This is followed by a length field indicating the 
length in bytes of the transmitted data.  The telegraph ends with a 15 bit CRC value encoded in two bytes 
leaving the LSB unused.

All bytes are framed by a recessive start bit at the beginning and a dominant stop bit at the end.

References

External links
 byteflight website

Auto parts
Computer buses